Carnies is a 2010 horror film directed by Brian Corder and starring Doug Jones.

Plot

In 1936 the Knuckles Brothers Show, a carnival sideshow, pulls into another in a long series of small towns, only to be plagued by a killer.

Cast
 Chris Staviski as Virgil
 Doug Jones as Ratcatcher
 David Markham as William Crowley
 Reggie Bannister as  Detective Conrad Ellison
 Denise Gossett as Helen
 Lynn Ayala as Zoe
 Lee Perkins as Professor James Algonquin

Release
The DVD release is set for October 12, 2010 on DVD and Video on Demand. The theatrical release is part of the "Week of Terror" festival in the Bluelight Cinemas in Cupertino, California.

References

External links
  at Carnytown
 
 
 

2010 films
American slasher films
2010 horror films
2010s English-language films
2010s American films